Moxy may refer to:

 Moxy (airline), formerly proposed name for the airline Breeze Airways in the United States
 Moxy (band), a Canadian hard rock band formed in the 1970s
 Moxy (album), 1975 
 Moxy II, 1976
 Moxy Engineering, a Norwegian dump truck manufacturer
 The Moxy Show, Cartoon Network's first original series
 Moxy, a nickname for the research chemical 5-MeO-MiPT
 Moxy, performer of theme music for Cartoon Network original series Ben 10
 MOXy, the EclipseLink implementation of Jakarta XML Binding

See also
 Moxie (disambiguation)
 Moxey (disambiguation)